Malamatina (Greek: Μαλαματίνα) is the name of a Greek wine brand, mostly known for its retsina.

It was founded in Alexandroupoli in 1895 by Konstantinos Malamatinas, a native of the island of Tenedos. The company has facilities in Euboea and Thessaloniki, where has its base.

References

Drink companies of Greece
Wineries of Greece
Greek brands
Food and drink companies established in 1895
Companies based in Thessaloniki
1895 establishments in Greece
Greek companies established in the 19th century